This article lists the confirmed squads for the 2013 Women's FIH Hockey Junior World Cup tournament held in Mönchengladbach, Germany between 27 July and 4 August 2013.

Pool A

Ghana
Head coach: Edmund Odametey

Bridget Azumah (GK)
Janet Adampa
Linda Barnie
Bennedicta Adjei
Emilia Fosuaa
Esther Ofori
Serwaa Boakye
Cecilia Amoako
Gloria Darko
Elizabeth Opoku
Martha Sarfoa
Ernestina Coffie
Cynthia Fio
Queensilla Shaibu
Nafisatu Umaru (C)
Theresa Mills
Susanna Danquah 
Joana Adjei (GK)

Netherlands
Head coach: Raoul Ehren

Anne Veenendaal (GK)
Lieke van Wijk
Xan de Waard
Sam Saxton
Laura Nunnink
Laurien Leurink
Sarah Jaspers
Floor Ouwerling
Maria Verschoor
Renske Siersema (C)
Elsie Nix
Marloes Keetels
Saskia van Duivenboden (GK)
Lisa Scheerlinck
Lisanne de Lange
Juliëtte van Hattum
Mila Muyselaar 
Lauren Stam

South Korea
Head coach: Yoo Kwang-Hee

Jung Hea-Bin (GK)
Cho Mi-Young
<li value=5>Cho Hye-Jin
<li value=6>Kim Mi-Ri
<li value=7>Kook Min-Ji
<li value=8>Shin Hye-Jeong
<li value=10>Choi Su-Ja
<li value=11>Lee Ha-Na
<li value=12>Park Ju-Hui
<li value=13>Kim Hyun-Ji
<li value=14>Nam So-Ri
<li value=15>Lee Yu-Ri
<li value=17>Choi Eun-Jin
<li value=18>Song Bo-Ram
<li value=20>Cha Ye-Sol
<li value=22>Han Mi-Jin (GK)
<li value=23>Cheon Eun-Bi ([[Captain (sports)|C]])
<li value=24>Kang Ji-Na

United States
Head coach: Steve Jennings

<li value=1>Samantha Carlino (GK)
<li value=2>Maxine Fluharty
<li value=3>Marie Elena Bolles
<li value=4>Emma Bolles
<li value=5>Laura Gebhart ([[Captain (sports)|C]])
<li value=7>Tara Vittese
<li value=8>Aileen Johnson
<li value=9>Emily Wold
<li value=10>Georgia Holland
<li value=11>Hannah Prince
<li value=12>Teresa Benvenuti
<li value=13>Kelsey Harbin
<li value=14>Katie Gerzabek
<li value=15>Ainsley McCallister
<li value=16>Lauren Blazing (GK)
<li value=17>Anna Dessoye
<li value=23>Kelsey Smither 
<li value=30>Nikki Parsley

Pool B

Argentina
Head coach: Santiago Capurro

<li value=1>Sofía Montserrat (GK)
<li value=2>Julia Gomes
<li value=3>Agustina Metidieri
<li value=4>Lucía Sanguinetti
<li value=5>Jimena Cedrés
<li value=6>Victoria Cabut
<li value=7>Agustina Albertario
<li value=8>Florencia Habif ([[Captain (sports)|C]])
<li value=9>Pilar Romang
<li value=10>Agustina Habif
<li value=11>Roberta Werthein
<li value=12>Antonella Brondello (GK)
<li value=13>Lara Ravetta
<li value=14>Mercedes Correa
<li value=15>Magdalena Fernández
<li value=16>Sofía Villarroya
<li value=17>María Granatto 
<li value=18>Luciana Molina

Canada
Head coach: Ian Rutledge

<li value=2>Lauren Logsuh (GK)
<li value=3>Rachel Donohoe
<li value=4>Priya Randhawa
<li value=5>Ashley Kristen
<li value=8>Stephanie Norlander
<li value=9>Amanda Woodcroft
<li value=10>Kathleen Leahy
<li value=11>Karli Johansen ([[Captain (sports)|C]])
<li value=12>Sydney Veljacic
<li value=13>Hannah Haughn ([[Captain (sports)|C]])
<li value=14>Jessica Buttinger
<li value=15>Carolina Romeo
<li value=16>Natalie Sourisseau ([[Captain (sports)|C]])
<li value=17>Sara McManus ([[Captain (sports)|C]])
<li value=19>Holly Stewart
<li value=20>Caashia Karringten
<li value=22>Madeline Secco 
<li value=30>Beatrice Francisco (GK)

China
Head coach: Xu Dong Guo

<li value=1>Ye Jiao (GK)
<li value=2>Ou Zixia
<li value=3>Liu Yuyue
<li value=4>Zhang Lijia
<li value=5>Shen Yang
<li value=6>You Jiaao
<li value=7>Chen Xin
<li value=8>Yuan Meng ([[Captain (sports)|C]])
<li value=9>Gu Bingfeng
<li value=10>Zhang Jinrong
<li value=11>Liu Meng
<li value=12>Tu Yidan
<li value=13>Li Hong
<li value=14>Zhang Xindan
<li value=15>Sun Jing
<li value=16>Chen Yang
<li value=18>Yu Yaran (GK)
<li value=19>Cui Luyao

South Africa
Head coach: Lindsey Wright

<li value=1>Phumelela Mbande (GK)
<li value=2>Sherry King
<li value=3>Izelle Lategan ([[Captain (sports)|C]])
<li value=4>Nika Nel
<li value=5>Tanya Britz
<li value=6>Taryn Mallett
<li value=7>Jacinta Jubb
<li value=8>Bronwyn Kretzmann
<li value=9>Liné Malan
<li value=10>Tiffany Jones
<li value=11>Lilian du Plessis
<li value=12>Suléke Brand
<li value=13>Erin Hunter
<li value=14>Nicole Walraven
<li value=15>Tarryn Glasby
<li value=19>Toni Marks
<li value=20>Nicole la Fleur (GK)
<li value=21>Quanita Bobbs

Pool C

Australia
Head coach: Craig Victory

<li value=1>Amelia Spence
<li value=2>Georgia Nanscawen
<li value=5>Audrey Smith (GK)
<li value=6>Brooke Peris
<li value=9>Anna Flanagan
<li value=10>Elizabeth Duguid (GK)
<li value=11>Karri McMahon
<li value=16>Jane Claxton ([[Captain (sports)|C]])
<li value=18>Kate Gilmore
<li value=19>Kathryn Slattery
<li value=20>Lily Brazel
<li value=21>Madison Fitzpatrick
<li value=23>Mathilda Carmichael
<li value=25>Jade Warrender
<li value=26>Emily Smith
<li value=27>Murphy Allendorf
<li value=29>Nina Khoury
<li value=30>Jordyn Holzberger

India
Head coach: Neil Hawgood

<li value=1>Sanarik Ningombam (GK)
<li value=2>Pinky Devi Thokchom
<li value=3>Deep Grace Ekka
<li value=4>Sushila Chanu ([[Captain (sports)|C]])
<li value=5>Namita Toppo
<li value=6>Monika Malik
<li value=9>Poonam Rani
<li value=10>Vandana Katariya
<li value=11>Lilima Minz
<li value=12>Navneet Kaur
<li value=13>Anupa Barla
<li value=14>Navjot Kaur
<li value=16>Bigan Soy (GK)
<li value=17>Lily Mayengbam
<li value=20>M. N. Ponnamma
<li value=28>Rani Rampal
<li value=30>Ritusha Arya
<li value=32>Manjit Kaur

New Zealand
Head coach: Chris Leslie

<li value=1>Georgia Barnett (GK)
<li value=2>Sophie Cocks
<li value=3>Rhiannon Dennison
<li value=4>Michaela Curtis ([[Captain (sports)|C]])
<li value=5>Genevieve Macilquham
<li value=6>Sian Fremaux
<li value=7>Sarah Matthews (GK)
<li value=8>Rachel McCann
<li value=10>Erin Goad
<li value=12>Danielle Sutherland
<li value=13>Phillipa Symes
<li value=14>Julia King
<li value=15>Kim Tanner
<li value=16>Brooke Neal
<li value=17>Elizabeth Thompson
<li value=18>Jenny Storey
<li value=19>Rose Keddell
<li value=22>Cassandra Reid

Russia
Head coach: Vladimir Kobzev

<li value=1>Olga Chugunova (GK)
<li value=2>Anna Egorova
<li value=3>Anna Sidorenko
<li value=4>Anna Efremova
<li value=5>Svetlana Salamatina ([[Captain (sports)|C]])
<li value=7>Anastasia Miroshnikova
<li value=8>Daria Kotina
<li value=9>Elena Vavilova
<li value=12>Natalia Kovganiuk
<li value=13>Alexandra Sosnina
<li value=14>Anna Krokhina
<li value=15>Polina Delova
<li value=16>Kseniia Koroleva
<li value=18>Viktoriia Aleksandrina (GK)
<li value=19>Anastasia Bryutova
<li value=20>Elena Guseva
<li value=23>Antonia Levashova
<li value=28>Iuliia Petrishcheva

Pool D

Belgium
Head coach: Shane McLeod

<li value=1>Elena Sotgiu (GK)
<li value=2>Malou Blank (GK)
<li value=3>Floriane Vilain
<li value=4>Florence Stappaerts
<li value=5>Charlotte Verelst
<li value=6>Noemie de Cocker
<li value=7>Pauline Leclef
<li value=8>Julie Fosseprez
<li value=9>Justine de Vooght ([[Captain (sports)|C]])
<li value=10>Estelle Meulemans
<li value=11>Silke Steenackers
<li value=12>Suzanne Geeraerts
<li value=13>Axelle Wouters
<li value=14>Emma Puvrez
<li value=15>Caroline Struijk
<li value=16>Emilie Meyvis
<li value=18>Julie de Paeuw
<li value=20>Anne-Sophie Weyns

England
Head coach: Craig Keegan

<li value=1>Caitlin Jeffries (GK)
<li value=2>Amy Tennant (GK)
<li value=3>Olivia Chilton
<li value=4>Josie Inverdale
<li value=5>Fran Tew
<li value=6>Alice Sharp
<li value=7>Suzy Petty
<li value=8>Emily Defroand
<li value=9>Lucy Hyams
<li value=10>Hannah Martin
<li value=11>Anna Toman
<li value=12>Sophie Crosley
<li value=13>Grace Balsdon
<li value=14>Joie Leigh
<li value=15>Rebecca van Berkel
<li value=16>Eliza Brett
<li value=17>Stephanie Addison
<li value=24>Shona McCallin ([[Captain (sports)|C]])

Germany
Head coach: Marc Herbert

<li value=1>Lisa Schneider (GK)
<li value=2>Nathalie Kubalski (GK)
<li value=3>Jana Gonnermann
<li value=6>Pia Lhotak
<li value=7>Lea Stöckel
<li value=9>Pia-Sophie Oldhafer
<li value=10>Anne Schröder
<li value=11>Anissa Korth
<li value=13>Darja Moellenberg
<li value=14>Lara May
<li value=15>Sabine Kneupfer
<li value=16>Viola Scharf
<li value=17>Rebecca Grote ([[Captain (sports)|C]])
<li value=18>Sarah Sprink
<li value=19>Marilena Krauss
<li value=20>Charlotte Stapenhorst
<li value=22>Cécile Pieper
<li value=26>Sophie Willig

Spain
Head coach: Jorge Donoso

<li value=1>Inés Arias (GK)
<li value=2>Marta Segú
<li value=6>Júlia Pons
<li value=7>Andrea Guerra
<li value=8>Carola Salvatella
<li value=10>Berta Bonastre ([[Captain (sports)|C]])
[[Cristina Guinea]]
<li value=12>[[Marta Bosque]]
<li value=13>[[Ana Marquinez]]
<li value=14>[[Carmen Cano]]
<li value=15>[[Cristina Salvatella]]
<li value=16>[[María Tost]]
<li value=18>[[Maider Altuna]]
<li value=19>[[Patricia Maraña]]
<li value=20>[[Xantal Giné]]
<li value=21>[[Mariona Girabent]] ([[Goalkeeper (field hockey)|GK]])
<li value=25>[[Alicia Magaz]]
{{div col end}}

References
{{reflist}}

{{Women's FIH Hockey Junior World Cup}}

[[Category:2013 Women's Hockey Junior World Cup|Squads]]
[[Category:Women's Hockey Junior World Cup squads]]